Harran Station is a railway station located in the village of Harran in the municipality of Grong in Trøndelag county, Norway.  It is located on the Nordlandsbanen railway line. The station opened in 1940, and has been unstaffed since 1989.

References

Railway stations in Trøndelag
Railway stations on the Nordland Line
Railway stations opened in 1940
1940 establishments in Norway
Grong